Viševek (in older sources Uševek) is a village south of Stari Trg pri Ložu in the Municipality of Loška Dolina in the Inner Carniola region of Slovenia.

Geography
Viševek includes the hamlet of Bajer (in older sources also Bajar) east of the village center. The word bajer means 'pond' in Slovene, and the hamlet is located next to a small pond.

Church

The local church in the settlement is dedicated to the Assumption of Mary and belongs to the Parish of Stari Trg.

References

External links

Viševek on Geopedia

Populated places in the Municipality of Loška Dolina